The Ministry of Finance in the Government of  Montenegro (Montenegrin: Ministarstvo finansija u Vladi Crne Gore / Министарство финансија у Влади Црне Горе, MFVCG) is the ministry in the Government of Montenegro which is in charge of the nation's finances. The ministry was established in 1879 as a ministry of the Principality of Montenegro. It was abolished in late 1922, but restored 23 years later, in 1945. Current Minister is  Aleksandar Damjanović, since 2022.

Ministers

Notes

External links
Official Website

Finance
Montenegro
Montenegro, Finance
Montenegro, Finance